Julie Stewart-Binks (born April 30, 1987) is a Canadian journalist who has worked for Barstool Sports, ESPN, and Fox Sports.

Early years
Stewart-Binks was born in Toronto, Ontario, where she attended Havergal College. Stewart-Binks graduated from Queen’s University in Kingston, Ontario, with a couple of undergraduate degrees. Stewart-Binks also graduated from City, University of London where she received her master's degree in international broadcast journalism.

Career
In 2010, Stewart-Binks was hired as a program assistant at the Canadian Broadcasting Corporation. She also was a reporter for the National Hockey League team Toronto Maple Leafs. In July 2011, Stewart-Binks was hired to the anchor desk by Fox Soccer Channel’s flagship program in Winnipeg, Manitoba. She was also a reporter for CTV Television Network in Regina, Saskatchewan.

Fox Sports 
In June 2013, Stewart-Binks was hired by Fox Sports as a news update anchor role with Fox Sports 1 at the new network’s studios in Los Angeles, California. Stewart-Binks also hosted "Fox Soccer Daily" a 30-minute daily studio soccer show, as well as reporting from the 2014 Winter Olympic Games in Sochi. She covered the MLS All-Star Game in Denver and also covered the MLS soccer match between Chicago Fire-FC Dallas. In 2015, she became Fox's regular sideline reporter for their newly acquired MLS matches.

ESPN 
In December 2016, Stewart-Binks was hired by ESPN as a sideline reporter for MLS and U.S. Men’s and Women’s National Team games. She also filled in as a sideline reporter on ESPN's College Football games. She became the first female reporter to call two straight MLS Cups with two different networks (FOX and ESPN).

Barstool Sports 
In 2017, Stewart-Binks joined Barstool Sports as the host of Barstool Breakfast on Sirius XM 85. On May 16, 2018, Stewart-Binks announced she was leaving Barstool Sports Radio and would take some time off to contemplate her next career move.

Fubo Sports Network 

On September 9, 2019, fuboTV announced that Stewart-Binks would be hosting two new sports-oriented talk shows on fubo Sports Network, "Call It A Night with Julie-Stewart-Binks" and "Drinks With Binks."

References

1987 births
Canadian television news anchors
Living people
Barstool Sports people
Journalists from Toronto
Queen's TV alumni
Women association football commentators
Toronto Maple Leafs announcers
American women television journalists
National Women's Soccer League commentators
21st-century American journalists
21st-century American women
21st-century Canadian journalists
21st-century Canadian women